The N66 road was a national secondary road in Ireland.

It latterly linked the M18 at Gort, County Galway to the N65 outside Loughrea at the north of the Loughrea Bypass.

Prior to the construction of the Loughrea Bypass and M18 during the 2000s the N66 ran from the N18 road in Gort to the N6 in Loughrea itself and this was its configuration for most of its lifetime which was from c. 1970 to 2005.

The N65, since 2010, continues north from Loughrea and forms an interchange with the M6. All routings lay entirely within County Galway.

En route it passed Thoor Ballylee, associated with William Butler Yeats.

It was downgraded as regional road R380 upon the completion of the M17/M18 scheme in September 2017.

See also
Roads in Ireland 
Motorways in Ireland
National primary road
Regional road

References

Roads Act 1993 (Classification of National Roads) Order 2006 – Department of Transport

National secondary roads in the Republic of Ireland
Roads in County Galway